Padar is a village of Mauganj tehsil in the Rewa district of Madhya Pradesh, India. It is situated near about 8 km south from Mauganj.

There is a big dam in Padar, south of Barahawatola and Nandanpur, which played an important role in irrigation of land of nearby villages i.e. Nandanpur, Padar, Kirtiya and many others villages.

Gallery

References

Villages in Rewa district